The United States Marine Corps Warfighting Laboratory (MCWL) was established in 1995, at Marine Corps Base Quantico, Virginia. The organization was originally known as the Commandant's Warfighting Laboratory.  
The battle lab is part of Combat Development and Integration—under Headquarters, United States Marine Corps—and its stated purpose is to improve current and future naval expeditionary warfare capabilities across the spectrum of conflict for current and future operating forces.

The organization is in charge of various aspects of advanced techniques and technology in the United States Marine Corps, and is also responsible for overseeing the Urban Warrior program.

See also

 United States Army Research, Development and Engineering Command (RDECOM)
 United States Army Research Laboratory (ARL)
 Office of Naval Research (ONR)
 Naval Research Laboratory (NRL)
 Air Force Research Laboratory (AFRL)· 
 DARPA · 
 Asymmetric warfare
 Commercial Hunter
 CQC
 Distributed operations
 Low-intensity operations
 Urban Warrior

References

External links
Marine Corps Warfighting Laboratory

Military units and formations of the United States Marine Corps
United States Marine Corps schools
1995 establishments in Virginia